Endorphins are opioid neuropeptides in mammals.

Endorphin may also refer to:

 Endorphin (software), A dynamic real-time motion synthesis software from NaturalMotion
 Endorphin (band), an electronic act from Cairns, Australia
 "Endorphin", a song by the musical metal band August Burns Red on their album Thrill Seeker 
 "Endorphins" (song), a 2013 song by Sub Focus with vocals from Alex Clare
Alternative spelling
 Endorphine (band), Thai pop singing group from the GMM Grammy records company, Bangkok, Thailand
 Endorphine (film), a 2015 Canadian film

See also
 Endorfun, a 1995 single-player puzzle computer game